The Hungary women's national handball team is the national team of Hungary. It is governed by the Hungarian Handball Federation and takes part in international handball competitions. The team won the World Championship in 1965 and the European Championship in 2000.

Results
 Champions   Runners-up   Third place   Fourth place

Olympic Games
Since their debut in 1976, Hungary has participated in seven Olympic Games. They received a silver medal in Sydney 2000.

World Championship
Hungary is regularly present at World Championships, having missed only 1990 and recently 2011. They won the tournament once in 1965 and have also received four silver and four bronze medals. In 2003, Hungary lost the final match against France 32–29 after one overtime.

European Championship
As of 2022, the Hungarian team has participated in every European Championship that has taken place. They won the tournament in 2000, after beating Ukraine 32–30 in the final.

Other tournaments
 Carpathian Trophy 1970 – Third place
 Carpathian Trophy 1971 – Second place
 Carpathian Trophy 1981 – Third place
 Carpathian Trophy 1984 – Second place
 Møbelringen Cup 2003 – Second place
 Carpathian Trophy 2011 – Third place
 Carpathian Trophy 2012 – Second place
 Carpathian Trophy 2016 – Winner
 Møbelringen Cup 2017 – Third place
 Møbelringen Cup 2018 – Fourth place

Team

Current squad
Squad for the friendly matches against Germany and Poland.

Head coach: Vladimir Golovin

Caps and goals correct as of 5 March 2023

Recent call ups

Technical staff
 Head coach: Vladimir Golovin
 Assistant coach: Krisztina Pigniczki
 Goalkeeping coach: Norbert Duleba
 Doctor: Balázs Lohner
 Masseur: Csaba Tímár
 Physiotherapist: Csaba Szikra-Mezey
 Fitness coach: Zoltán Holanek

Retired numbers

Notable players
IHF World Player of the Year
 Erzsébet Kocsis (right back), 1995
 Bojana Radulović (right back), 2000 and 2003
 Anita Kulcsár (line player), 2004
 Anita Görbicz (centre back), 2005

MVP
 Beáta Siti (centre back), 2000 European Championship

All-Star Team members
 Katalin Szilágyi (right wing), 1995 World Championship
 Erzsébet Kocsis (line player), 1996 Summer Olympics
 Dóra Lőwy (left wing), 1999 World Championship
 Bojana Radulović (right back), 2000 Summer Olympics, 2003 World Championship
 Beáta Siti (centre back), 2000 European Championship
 Beatrix Balogh (right wing), 2001 World Championship
 Anita Görbicz (centre back), 2003 World Championship, 2005 World Championship, 2007 World Championship, 2013 World Championship
 Ibolya Mehlmann (right back), 2006 European Championship
 Orsolya Vérten (left wing), 2008 Summer Olympics
 Noémi Háfra (left back), 2018 European Championship
 Katrin Klujber (right back), 2022 European Championship

Top Scorers 
 Ágnes Farkas (left back), 2002 European Championship (58 goals)
 Bojana Radulović (right back), 2003 World Championship (97 goals), 2004 Summer Olympics (54 goals), 2004 European Championship (72 goals)

Other notable players
 Katalin Pálinger
 Magda Jóna
 Ildikó Pádár
 Marianna Gódorné Nagy
 Amália Sterbinszky
 Beatrix Kökény
 Beáta Hoffmann
 Krisztina Pigniczki
 Marianna Racz

Captains
 Katalin Pálinger – 2008 Summer Olympics, 2008 European Championship, 2010 European Championship
 Orsolya Vérten – 2009 World Championship
 Anita Görbicz – 2012 European Championship, 2013 World Championship, 2015 World Championship, 2016 European Championship, 2017 World Championship
 Zsuzsanna Tomori – 2014 European Championship
 Anikó Kovacsics – 2018 European Championship, 2019 World Championship, 2020 European Championship, 2020 Summer Olympics
 Blanka Bíró – 2021 World Championship
 Dóra Hornyák – 2022 European Championship

Past squads
1957 World Championship (Second placed)
 Éva Arany, Zsuzsa Béres, Borbála Cselőtei, Árpádné Csicsmányi, Katalin Gardó, Ferencné Geszti, Gyuláné Hanczmann, Magda Jóna, Magda Kiss, Aranka Rachel-Segal, Lídia Simonek, Éva Szendi, Mária Vályi, Erika Wéser.
Coach: Bódog Török

1962 World Championship (Fifth placed)
 Éva Arany, Elemérné Bakó, Márta Balogh, Lajosné Cserháti, Béláné Fodor, Ágnes Hanus, Klára Höbenreich, Magda Jóna, Erzsébet Pásztor, Anna Rothermel, Éva Szendi, Judit Szűcs, Mária Tóth,Ilona Urbán, Zsuzsa Varga, Ágnes Végh.
Coach: Bódog Török

1965 World Championship (Winner)
Ágnes Babos, Márta Balogh, Erzsébet Bognár, Márta Giba, Ágnes Hanus, Mária Holub, Ilona Ignácz, Magda Jóna, Erzsébet Lengyel, Erzsébet Pásztor, Anna Rothermel, Mária Tóth, Zsuzsanna Varga, Ágnes Végh.
Coach: Bódog Török

1971 World Championship (Third placed)
 Ágnes Babos, Erzsébet Bognár, Ágota Bujdosó, Erzsébet Drozdik, Márta Giba, Klára Horváth, Éva Kovács, Erzsébet Nyári, Mária Polszter, Anna Rothermel, Amália Sterbinszky, Ilona Szabó, Rozália Tomann, Borbála Tóth Harsányi, Katalin Tóth Harsányi.
Coach: Bódog Török

1973 World Championship (Fourth placed)
 Mária Berzsenyi, Ágota Bujdosó, Márta Giba, Klára Horváth, Piroska Németh, Erzsébet Nyári, Márta Pacsai, Anna Rothermel, Amália Sterbinszky, Katalin Tavaszi, Rozália Tomann, Borbála Tóth Harsányi, Katalin Tóth Harsányi, Mária Vanya.
Coach: Bódog Török

1975 World Championship (Third placed)
 Éva Angyal, Mária Berzsenyi, Ágota Bujdosó, Klára Horváth, Ilona Nagy, Marianna Nagy, Erzsébet Németh, Márta Pacsai, Zsuzsanna Pethő, Ilona Samus, Amália Sterbinszky, Katalin Tavaszi, Rozália Tomann, Katalin Tóth Harsányi, Mária Vanya, Krisztina Wohner.
Coach: Bódog Török

1976 Summer Olympics (Third placed)
Éva Angyal, Mária Berzsenyi, Ágota Bujdosó, Klára Horváth, Ilona Nagy, Marianna Nagy, Erzsébet Németh, Márta Pacsai, Zsuzsanna Pethő, Amália Sterbinszky, Rozália Tomann, Borbála Tóth Harsányi, Katalin Tóth Harsányi, Mária Vanya.
Coach: Bódog Török

1978 World Championship (Third placed)
 Éva Angyal, Mária Berzsenyi, Éva Bozó, Klára Éliás, Györgyi Győrvári, Mária Hajós, Erika Magyar, Ilona Nagy, Marianna Nagy, Erzsébet Németh, Ilona Samus, Amália Sterbinszky, Anikó Szabadfi, Rozália Tomann, Mária Vanya, Krisztina Wohner.
Coach: Bódog Török

1980 Summer Olympics (Fourth placed)
Éva Angyal, Mária Berzsenyi, Klára Bonyhádi, Éva Bozó, Piroska Budai, Györgyi Győrvári, Klára Horváth, Marianna Nagy, Erzsébet Németh, Erzsébet Nyári, Ilona Samus, Amália Sterbinszky, Rozália Tomann, Mária Vanya.
Coach: Mihály Lele

1982 World Championship (Second placed)
 Valéria Agocs, Éva Angyal, Ildikó Barna, Klára Bonyhádi, Katalin Gombai, Anna György, Györgyi Győrvári, Klára Horváth, Gabriella Jakab, Marianna Nagy, Erzsébet Németh, Erzsébet Nyári, Zsuzsa Nyári, Mariann Rácz, Amália Sterbinszky, Mária Vanya.
Coach: János Csík

1986 World Championship (Eighth placed)
 Mária Ácsbog, Ildikó Barna, Erika Csapó, Csilla Elekes, Éva Erdős, Marianna Nagy, Erzsébet Németh, Anna György, Éva Kiss, Éva Kovács, Katalin Major, Zsuzsa Nyári, Csilla Orbán, Mariann Rácz, Katalin Szilágyi, Ágota Utasi, Márta Varga.
Coach: Zsolt Barabás

1993 World Championship (Seventh placed)
 Erika Csapó, Edit Csendes, Éva Erdős, Ágnes Farkas, Beáta Hoffmann, Erzsébet Kocsis, Beatrix Kökény, Eszter Mátéfi, Anikó Meksz, Helga Németh, Erika Oravecz, Melinda Szabó, Katalin Szilágyi, Brigitta Szopóczy, Ágota Utasi, Márta Varga.
Coach: László Laurencz

1994 European Championship (Fourth placed)
Beatrix Balogh, Edit Csendes, Rita Deli, Ágnes Farkas, Rita Hochrajter, Beáta Hoffmann, Erzsébet Kocsis, Beatrix Kökény, Anikó Meksz, Helga Németh, Ildikó Pádár, Anna Szántó, Brigitta Szopóczy, Beatrix Tóth, Ágota Utasi.
Coach: László Laurencz

1995 World Championship (Second placed)
 Éva Erdős, Andrea Farkas, Ágnes Farkas, Beáta Hoffmann, Anikó Kántor, Erzsébet Kocsis, Beatrix Kökény, Eszter Mátéfi, Anikó Meksz, Anikó Nagy, Helga Németh, Ildikó Pádár, Beáta Siti, Anna Szántó, Katalin Szilágyi, Beatrix Tóth.
Coach: László Laurencz

1996 Summer Olympics (Third placed)
Éva Erdős, Andrea Farkas, Beáta Hoffmann, Anikó Kántor, Erzsébet Kocsis, Beatrix Kökény, Eszter Mátéfi, Auguszta Mátyás, Anikó Meksz, Anikó Nagy, Helga Németh, Ildikó Pádár, Beáta Siti, Anna Szántó, Katalin Szilágyi, Beatrix Tóth.
Coach: László Laurencz

1996 European Championship (Tenth placed)
Beatrix Balogh, Rita Borók, Éva Erdős, Andrea Farkas, Beáta Hoffmann, Klára Kertész, Erzsébet Kocsis, Anita Kulcsár, Eszter Mátéfi, Anikó Meksz, Anikó Nagy, Beáta Siti, Éva Szarka, Gabriella Takács, Beatrix Tóth, Anasztázia Virincsik.
Coach: László Laurencz

1997 World Championship (Ninth placed)
 Beatrix Balogh, Rita Borók, Rita Deli, Éva Erdős, Andrea Farkas, Ágnes Farkas, Anikó Kántor, Fanni Kenyeres, Anita Kulcsár, Anikó Meksz, Helga Németh, Ildikó Pádár, Katalin Pálinger, Zsófia Pásztor, Melinda Szabó, Gabriella Takács.
Coach: János Csík

1998 European Championship (Third placed)
Beatrix Balogh, Rita Deli, Ágnes Farkas, Andrea Farkas, Anikó Kántor, Beatrix Kökény, Anita Kulcsár, Anikó Meksz, Anikó Nagy, Helga Németh, Ildikó Pádár, Katalin Pálinger, Krisztina Pigniczki, Judit Simics, Beáta Siti, Gabriella Takács.
Coach: Lajos Mocsai

1999 World Championship (Fifth placed)
 Beatrix Balogh, Nikolett Brigovácz, Rita Deli, Andrea Farkas, Ágnes Farkas, Anikó Kántor, Beatrix Kökény, Anita Kulcsár, Dóra Lőwy, Anikó Nagy, Ildikó Pádár, Katalin Pálinger, Krisztina Pigniczki, Judit Simics, Beáta Siti, Gabriella Takács.
Coach: Lajos Mocsai

2000 Summer Olympics (Second placed)
Beatrix Balogh, Rita Deli, Ágnes Farkas, Andrea Farkas, Anikó Kántor, Beatrix Kökény, Anita Kulcsár, Dóra Lőwy, Anikó Nagy, Ildikó Pádár, Katalin Pálinger, Krisztina Pigniczki, Bojana Radulovics, Judit Simics, Beáta Siti.
Coach: Lajos Mocsai

2000 European Championship (Winner)
Nikolett Brigovácz, Ágnes Farkas, Anikó Kántor, Gabriella Kindl, Erika Kirsner, Beatrix Kökény, Anita Kulcsár, Krisztina Nagy, Ildikó Pádár, Katalin Pálinger, Zsuzsanna Pálffy, Krisztina Pigniczki, Judit Simics, Beáta Siti, Eszter Siti, Tímea Sugár.
Coach: Lajos Mocsai

2001 World Championship (Sixth placed)
 Beatrix Balogh, Rita Borók, Rita Deli, Andrea Farkas, Ágnes Farkas, Gabriella Kindl, Erika Kirsner, Anita Kulcsár, Ildikó Pádár, Zsuzsanna Pálffy, Katalin Pálinger, Krisztina Pigniczki, Bojana Radulovics, Beáta Siti, Eszter Siti, Tímea Sugár.
Coach: Lajos Mocsai

2002 European Championship (Fifth placed)
Beatrix Balogh, Ágnes Farkas, Anita Görbicz, Erika Kirsner, Anita Kulcsár, Zsuzsanna Lovász, Ibolya Mehlmann, Helga Németh, Ildikó Pádár, Katalin Pálinger, Krisztina Pigniczki, Eszter Siti, Tímea Sugár, Hortenzia Szrnka, Tímea Tóth, Orsolya Vérten.
Coach: Lajos Mocsai

2003 World Championship (Second placed)
 Beáta Bohus, Ágnes Farkas, Bernadett Ferling, Anita Görbicz, Erika Kirsner, Anita Kulcsár, Zsuzsanna Lovász, Ibolya Mehlmann, Katalin Pálinger, Krisztina Pigniczki, Bojana Radulovics, Eszter Siti, Irina Sirina, Tímea Sugár, Hortenzia Szrnka, Tímea Tóth.
Coach: Lajos Mocsai

2004 Summer Olympics (Fifth placed)
Beáta Bohus, Ágnes Farkas, Bernadett Ferling, Anita Görbicz, Erika Kirsner, Anita Kulcsár, Zsuzsanna Lovász, Ibolya Mehlmann, Katalin Pálinger, Zsuzsanna Pálffy, Krisztina Pigniczki, Bojana Radulovics, Irina Sirina, Eszter Siti, Tímea Tóth.
Coach: Lajos Mocsai

2004 European Championship (Third placed)
Beatrix Balogh, Beáta Bohus, Bernadett Ferling, Anita Görbicz, Gabriella Kindl, Anita Kulcsár, Zsuzsanna Lovász, Ibolya Mehlmann, Ivett Nagy, Katalin Pálinger, Krisztina Pigniczki, Bojana Radulovics, Irina Sirina, Eszter Siti, Gabriella Szűcs, Tímea Tóth.
Coach: Szilárd Kiss

2005 World Championship (Third placed)
 Beatrix Balogh, Rita Borbás, Bernadett Ferling, Anita Görbicz, Ágnes Hornyák, Fanni Kenyeres, Gabriella Kindl, Mónika Kovacsicz, Ibolya Mehlmann, Cecília Őri, Katalin Pálinger, Eszter Siti, Tímea Sugár, Gabriella Szűcs, Tímea Tóth, Orsolya Vérten.
Coach: András Németh

2006 European Championship (Fifth placed)
Beatrix Balogh, Rita Borbás, Zsanett Borbély, Bernadett Ferling, Anita Görbicz, Orsolya Herr, Ágnes Hornyák, Erika Kirsner, Mónika Kovacsicz, Ibolya Mehlmann, Katalin Pálinger, Eszter Siti, Piroska Szamoránsky, Gabriella Szűcs, Tímea Tóth, Orsolya Vérten.
Coach: András Németh

2007 World Championship (Eighth placed)
 Beatrix Balogh, Rita Borbás, Bernadett Ferling, Anita Görbicz, Orsolya Herr, Ágnes Hornyák, Erika Kirsner, Mónika Kovacsicz, Ibolya Mehlmann, Katalin Pálinger, Piroska Szamoránsky, Gabriella Szűcs, Zita Szucsánszki, Zsuzsanna Tomori, Tímea Tóth, Orsolya Vérten.
Coach: András Németh

2008 Summer Olympics (Fourth placed)
Bernadett Bódi, Rita Borbás, Bernadett Ferling, Anita Görbicz, Orsolya Herr, Ágnes Hornyák, Mónika Kovacsicz, Katalin Pálinger, Krisztina Pigniczki, Piroska Szamoránsky, Gabriella Szűcs, Zsuzsanna Tomori, Tímea Tóth, Orsolya Vérten.
Coach: János Hajdu

2008 European Championship (Eighth placed)
Barbara Balogh, Bernadett Bódi, Anita Bulath, Anita Görbicz, Orsolya Herr, Ágnes Hornyák, Mónika Kovacsicz, Katalin Pálinger, Melinda Pastrovics, Anett Sopronyi, Piroska Szamoránsky, Gabriella Szűcs, Zita Szucsánszki, Zsuzsanna Tomori, Orsolya Vérten, Melinda Vincze.
Coach: Vilmos Imre

2009 World Championship (Ninth placed)
 Bernadett Bódi, Anita Bulath, Orsolya Herr, Gabriella Juhász, Anikó Kovacsics, Adrienn Orbán, Melinda Pastrovics, Valéria Szabó, Klára Szekeres, Zita Szucsánszki, Zsuzsanna Tomori, Katalin Tóth, Tímea Tóth, Ágnes Triffa, Orsolya Vérten, Szandra Zácsik.
Coach: Eszter Mátéfi

2010 European Championship (Tenth placed)
Szilvia Ábrahám, Bernadett Bódi, Anita Bulath, Orsolya Herr, Anikó Kovacsics, Mónika Kovacsicz, Katalin Pálinger, Anett Sopronyi, Valéria Szabó, Piroska Szamoránsky, Klára Szekeres, Zita Szucsánszki, Bernadett Temes, Zsuzsanna Tomori, Tímea Tóth, Orsolya Vérten, Melinda Vincze.
Coach: Eszter Mátéfi

2012 European Championship (Third placed)
Bernadett Bódi, Anita Bulath, Anita Görbicz, Orsolya Herr, Éva Kiss, Kinga Klivinyi, Anikó Kovacsics, Mónika Kovacsicz, Viktória Rédei Soós, Valéria Szabó, Piroska Szamoránsky, Klára Szekeres, Zita Szucsánszki, Zsuzsanna Tomori, Krisztina Triscsuk, Orsolya Vérten, Melinda Vincze.
Coach: Karl Erik Bøhn

2013 World Championship (Eighth placed)
Bernadett Bódi, Anita Bulath, Anita Cifra, Anita Görbicz, Orsolya Herr, Éva Kiss, Anikó Kovacsics, Mónika Kovacsicz, Viktória Rédei Soós, Piroska Szamoránszky, Klára Szekeres, Zita Szucsánszki, Zsuzsanna Tomori, Krisztina Triscsuk, Orsolya Vérten, Melinda Vincze, Szandra Zácsik.
Coach: János Hajdu

2014 European Championship (Sixth placed)
Blanka Bíró, Bernadett Bódi, Anita Bulath, Ildikó Erdősi, Orsolya Herr, Kinga Klivinyi, Anikó Kovacsics, Mónika Kovacsicz, Szabina Mayer, Rea Mészáros, Szimonetta Planéta, Piroska Szamoránszky, Zita Szucsánszki, Bernadett Temes, Zsuzsanna Tomori, Gabriella Tóth, Krisztina Triscsuk.
Coach: András Németh

2015 World Championship (Eleventh placed)
Blanka Bíró, Bernadett Bódi, Anita Bulath, Ildikó Erdősi, Anita Görbicz, Dóra Hornyák, Éva Kiss, Anikó Kovacsics, Mónika Kovacsicz, Szabina Mayer, Szimonetta Planéta, Piroska Szamoránszky, Klára Szekeres, Zita Szucsánszki, Zsuzsanna Tomori, Krisztina Triscsuk, Szandra Zácsik.
Coach: András Németh

2016 European Championship (Twelfth placed)
Bernadett Bódi, Luca Dombi, Ildikó Erdősi, Anita Görbicz, Dóra Hornyák, Kinga Janurik, Anett Kisfaludy, Éva Kiss, Kinga Klivinyi, Anna Kovács, Viktória Lukács, Rea Mészáros, Szimonetta Planéta, Nadine Schatzl, Klára Szekeres, Melinda Szikora, Krisztina Triscsuk.
Coach: Kim Rasmussen

2017 World Championship (Fifteenth placed)
Blanka Bíró, Bernadett Bódi, Anita Görbicz, Noémi Háfra, Kinga Janurik, Anett Kisfaludy, Kinga Klivinyi, Anikó Kovacsics, Anna Kovács, Viktória Lukács, Szabina Mayer, Rea Mészáros, Nadine Schatzl, Klára Szekeres, Szandra Szöllősi-Zácsik, Zita Szucsánszki, Gabriella Tóth.
Coach: Kim Rasmussen

2018 European Championship (Seventh placed)
Blanka Bíró, Noémi Háfra, Anita Kazai, Éva Kiss, Anikó Kovacsics, Anna Kovács, Rita Lakatos, Viktória Lukács, Rea Mészáros, Adrienn Orbán, Barbara Pálos-Bognár, Szimonetta Planéta, Nadine Schatzl, Laura Szabó, Babett Szalai, Gabriella Tóth, Petra Tóvizi.
Coach: Kim Rasmussen

2019 World Championship (Fourteenth placed)
Blanka Bíró, Dorottya Faluvégi, Noémi Háfra, Éva Kiss, Nikolett Kiss, Katrin Klujber, Anikó Kovacsics, Anna Kovács, Viktória Lukács, Gréta Márton, Noémi Pásztor, Nadine Schatzl, Laura Szabó, Zsuzsanna Tomori, Gabriella Tóth, Petra Tóvizi, Ágnes Triffa, Petra Vámos.
Coach: Kim Rasmussen

Coaching history

Individual all-time records

Most matches played
Total number of matches played in official competitions only.

Last updated: 6 November 2022Source: kezitortenelem.hu

Most goals scored
Total number of goals scored in official matches only.

Last updated: 6 November 2022Source: kezitortenelem.hu

See also
Hungary women's national junior handball team
Hungary women's national youth handball team

References

External links

IHF profile

National team
Women's national handball teams
Hand